Matthew Tawo Mbu (20 November 1929 – 6 February 2012) was a Nigerian lawyer, politician, diplomat, and a permanent fixture in Nigerian political affairs for more than fifty years.

Early life
Mbu was born in Okundi, Cross River State.  He received his early education at Okundi Primary School from 1937 to 1940.
He also attended the Kakwagon Seminary School between 1941and 1943, before proceeding to Middle Temple and University College, London, from 1955 to 1959, where he received the LLB and the LLM. Chief Mbu was subsequently called to the Bar, Middle Temple.

Ambassador Dr. Matthew Tawo Mbu, LL.B (Hons), LL.M. Ph.D., D.I.A (Lond), Barrister-at-Law of the Honourable Society of the Middle Temple (1959) and Advocate and Solicitor of the Supreme Court of Nigeria (1960)

Matthew Tawo Mbu was born on 20 November 1929 in Okundi, Osokom Clan, Boki LGA, Cross River State to Chief Mbu Tawo and Madam Eshian Atim Tawo both members of the ruling Chieftaincy families of Osokom and Oku towns in Osokom Clan.  His early education was at various Roman Catholic mission schools in Boki LGA, then Wolsey Hall, Oxford (postal tuition), University College London and the Middle Temple, London. A lifelong intellectual, MT Mbu was awarded his Ph.D by London University in 1995 at the age of 66, his thesis being centred on the OAU and its settlement of African disputes.

After a brief but successful stint working for John Holt, the young MT launched into his political career driven on by the words of his childhood mentor Fr. Patrick Meeham - "you are for your people. You go and speak for them" - and inspired by his first political mentor, Nnamdi Azikiwe.

Legislative and ministerial posts:

Member representing Ogoja in the Eastern House of Assembly and House of Representatives, 1952–53

Member for Ogoja in the House of Representatives, 1954–55

Member of Parliament for Ogoja, 1960–66

Federal Minister of Labour, 1953–54; Nigeria’s youngest ever Minister at 23 years of age.

Ag. Minister of Transport, 1954

Ag. Minister of Commence and Industry, 1954–55

Ag. Minister of Works, 1955

Minister of State (Naval Affairs) in the Prime Minister’s Office, 1960

Minister of Defence (Navy), 1961–65

Special Assistant to the Prime Minister on Foreign Affairs, 1963–66

Minister of Transport and Aviation, 1966

Minister of Foreign Affairs, 1992–93

Diplomatic career:

Nigeria’s Pioneer Diplomat:

First High Commissioner for Nigeria in UK, 1955-59.

First Nigerian Chief Representative in Washington DC, U.S.A., 1959-60.

First Nigerian Chief Representative in the United Nations, 1959-60.

Nigeria’s Chief Delegate and Chief Negotiator to the United Nations Disarmament Conference in Geneva, 1963–65

Nigeria’s Chief Delegate and Vice-President of the International Parliamentary Union (IPU), 1960–66

President of the Juridical and Parliamentary Committee of the IPU, 1962–66

Chief Delegate to the United Nations Conference on Diplomatic Privileges and Intercourse in Vienna, Austria, 1961–63

Chief Delegate to the International Civil Aviation Organisation Conference (ICAO), Tokyo, 1964

Leader, Nigerian Delegation to the Commonwealth Parliamentary Association Conference, Canada 1963 and Jamaica, 1964

Signatory to the U.N. Convention banning Chemical Weapons, Paris, 1993 – having attended its very first sitting in 1963 as Special Assistant (Foreign Affairs) to Prime Minister Tafawa Balewa

Nigerian Ambassador to Germany, 1998–99

OAU assignments:

Appointed Head of the OAU Commission to investigate President Sylvanus Olympio of Togo’s assassination in 1963.

Appointed Nigerian Chief Delegate to the OAU Conference in Addis Ababa in 1963.

Nigerian Chief Delegate to the Conference on the Army Mutiny in Tanganyika (now Tanzania) in 1964.

Led Nigerian Delegation to the funeral of the Late Indian Prime Minister Lal Shastri in 1966 - and for this reason alone he was out of the Country that fateful day in January 1966

Public offices :

Chairman, Eastern Nigeria Public Service Commission, 1966–67

Biafran Foreign Minister, 1967–70

Chairman, Investment Trust Company, South Eastern State, 1971–75

Member of the Constituent Assembly, 1977–78

Pro-Chancellor and Chairman of Council, University of Ife, 1980–84

Chairman, Cross River State Think Tank Forum, 1984–87

Chancellor, Abia State University, 1996-2007

Consultant to the Federal Government on Industrial Maintenance and Training, 1999-2007

Federal Government Delegate to the National Political Reforms Conference and Chairman, Committee on Foreign Policy and International Relations, 2005

Chairman, Board of Trustees, South - South Peoples Assembly (SSPA) from 2005

Private Sector Appointments :

Chairman, Alraine (Nigeria) Ltd, PGN Ltd, Wiggins Teape Nigeria Plc, Plessey Company (Nigeria) Ltd, Grindlays Merchant Bank Nigeria Ltd (Now Stanbic IBTC), Vice-President and Chairman, Corporate Affairs Committee, Manufacturer’s Association of Nigeria (MAN)

Membership of International Bodies :

Fellow of the London Institute of World Affairs

Fellow of the Royal Society of Arts

Fellow of the Royal Economic Society

Fellow of the Royal Commonwealth Society

President of the Nigeria Society of International Law, 2001 

Biographical Listings :

Who’s Who in the Commonwealth

Who’s Who in the World

Who’s Who in Nigeria and Africa

Included in American Biography of Men of Distinction in the 20th Century

Elected by Cambridge Biographical Centre, England as an Icon for service to humanity in the field of Diplomacy

Academic,  national and other awards :

LL.D (Honoris Causa) University of Ibadan, 1988

D.Litt (Honoris Causa) University of Cross River (now University of Uyo), 1991

LL.D (Honoris Causa) University of Calabar, 1992
‘
		D. Litt (Honoris Causa) Abia State University, 1996

Commander of the Order of the Federal Republic (CFR), 2000

Officer and Knight of St. John International (KSJ)

Certificate of Honour by St. John International for distinguished service to the society and the church

Noble Degree of Knights of St. John International, 2011

Otu Agrinya I of Boki

Ada Idagha Ke Efik Eburutu

In the early hours of 6 February 2012 the living legend, Ambassador Dr. M. T. Mbu, the ‘Star of Ogoja’, the ‘Baby Minister’, the ‘Wonder Boy of the Commonwealth’ slept in the bosom of the Lord. May the Almighty God continue to bless his soul forever more Amen.

Political career
Chief M. T. Mbu’s political career began with his membership of Parliament from 1952 to 1955.

He has also served his country in various capacities including:
Federal Minister of Labour, 1954
High Commissioner to UK, 1955 to 1959
Representative of Nigeria, Washington DC. 1966.

He holds the distinction of being the youngest Nigerian ever to serve in the federal cabinet. Between 1960 and 1966, Chief Mbu returned to serve again in Parliament. During the latter period in Parliament, he served as Federal Minister of Defense for Naval Affairs.

He was appointed Chairman, Eastern Nigeria Public Service Commission in 1967, and became Member Constituent Assembly from 1977 to 1978. He was the first national vice-chairman of the Nigeria People’s Party from 1979 to 1981 before moving to the National Party of Nigeria from 1981 to 1983.

On several occasions, Chief Mbu has represented his Nation as an ambassador to foreign countries, including a recent appointment as Ambassador to Germany. He has also served as the Pro-Chancellor at Obafemi Awolowo University in Ile-Ife, Nigeria.

He served as his country's Foreign Minister from January to November 1993.

Chief Mbu was the leader of the South-South Peoples Assembly, (SSPA), a non-political organization that was created to help promote the interests of the peoples of the South-South geo-political zone.

His legacy has been continued by his son, Senator Matthew Tawo Mbu (Jr.), who is also a prominent politician.

References

External links
Interview with Matthew Mbu
Detail on Mbu at the Alex Ekwueme Foundation web site

1929 births
2012 deaths
Alumni of University College London
Alumni of University of London Worldwide
Foreign ministers of Nigeria
Federal ministers of Nigeria
Members of the House of Representatives (Nigeria)
High Commissioners of Nigeria to the United Kingdom
Ambassadors of Nigeria to Germany
People from Cross River State
Fellows of the Royal Commonwealth Society